Brickell City Centre, formerly known and still referred to as Eighth Street, is a Metromover station in the Brickell district of Downtown, Miami, Florida,  east of Little Havana. This station is located on the Tamiami Trail (Southeast Eighth Street/US 41) near First Avenue. It opened to service May 26, 1994.  Eighth Street station and its grounds received significant upgrades as part of Swire Properties' $1.05 billion Brickell City Centre project throughout its closure from August 2014 to November 2015. While the station reopened in 2015, the third floor connection to Brickell City Centre remained closed through October 2016.

Station layout

References

External links

 
 MDT – Metromover Stations
 8th Street entrance from Google Maps Street View
 7th Street entrance from Google Maps Street View

Brickell Loop
Metromover stations
Railway stations in the United States opened in 1994
1994 establishments in Florida